Mustelidae is a family of mammals in the order Carnivora, which includes weasels, badgers, otters, ferrets, martens, minks, and wolverines, and many other extant and extinct genera. A member of this family is called a mustelid; Mustelidae is the largest family in Carnivora, and its extant species are divided into eight subfamilies. They are found on all continents except Antarctica and Australia, and are a diverse family; sizes range, including tails, from the widespread 17 cm (7 in) least weasel to the 1.8-meter (6 ft) giant otter of Amazonian South America. Habitats vary widely as well, from the arboreal marten to the fossorial European badger to the marine sea otter. Population sizes are largely unknown, though two species, the sea mink and Japanese otter, were hunted to extinction in 1894 and 1979, respectively, and several other species are endangered. Some species have been domesticated, e.g. the ferret and some populations of the South American tayra. Mustelidae is one of the oldest families in Carnivora; early mustelids first appeared around 28–33 million years ago.

The 23 genera and 63 extant species of Mustelidae are split into 8 subfamilies: Guloninae, martens and wolverines; Helictidinae, ferret-badgers; Ictonychinae, African polecats and grisons; Lutrinae, otters; Melinae, Eurasian badgers; Mellivorinae, the honey badger; Mustelinae, weasels and minks; and Taxidiinae, the American badger. In addition to the extant subfamilies, Mustelidae includes three extinct subfamilies designated as Leptarctinae, Mustelavinae, and Oligobuninae. Extinct species have also been placed into all of the extant subfamilies besides Helictidinae, in both extant and extinct genera; around 200 extinct Mustelidae species have been found, as well as fossil genera not given a species name, though due to ongoing research and discoveries the exact number and categorization is not fixed.

Conventions

Conservation status codes listed follow the International Union for Conservation of Nature (IUCN) Red List of Threatened Species. Range maps are provided wherever possible; if a range map is not available, a description of the mustelid's range is provided. Ranges are based on the IUCN Red List for that species unless otherwise noted. All extinct species or subspecies listed alongside extant species went extinct after 1500 CE, and are indicated by a dagger symbol "". Population figures are rounded to the nearest hundred.

Classification
The family Mustelidae consists of 63 extant species belonging to 23 genera and divided into hundreds of extant subspecies, as well the extinct sea mink and Japanese otter, which are the only mustelid species to become extinct since prehistoric times. This does not include hybrid species or extinct prehistoric species. Modern molecular studies indicate that the 23 genera can be grouped into 8 subfamilies. Some prior classification schemes divided the family solely between the aquatic otters and all other species.

Subfamily Guloninae (Martens and wolverines)
Genus Eira: one species
Genus Gulo: one species
Genus Martes: six species
Genus Pekania: one species
Subfamily Helictidinae (Ferret-badgers)
Genus Melogale: five species
Subfamily Ictonychinae (African polecats and grisons)
Genus Galictis: two species
Genus Ictonyx: two species
Genus Lyncodon: one species
Genus Poecilogale: one species
Genus Vormela: one species
Subfamily Lutrinae (Otters)
Genus Aonyx: three species
Genus Enhydra: one species
Genus Hydrictis: one species
Genus Lontra: four species
Genus Lutra: three species
Genus Lutrogale: one species
Genus Pteronura: one species

Subfamily Melinae (Eurasian badgers)
Genus Arctonyx: three species
Genus Meles: three species
Subfamily Mellivorinae (Honey badger)
Genus Mellivora: one species
Subfamily Mustelinae (Weasels and minks)
Genus Mustela: fifteen species
Genus Neogale: five species
Subfamily Taxidiinae (American badger)
Genus Taxidea: one species

Mustelids
The following classification is based on the taxonomy described by Mammal Species of the World (2005), with augmentation by generally accepted proposals made since using molecular phylogenetic analysis; this includes reclassifying Guloninae, Helictidinae, Ictonychinae, Melinae, Mellivorinae, and Taxidiinae as subfamilies rather than as part of a paraphyletic group with Mustelinae

Subfamily Guloninae

Subfamily Helictidinae

Subfamily Ictonychinae

Subfamily Lutrinae

Subfamily Melinae

Subfamily Mellivorinae

Subfamily Mustelinae

Subfamily Taxidiinae

Prehistoric mustelids
In addition to extant mustelids, a number of prehistoric species have been discovered and classified as a part of Mustelidae. Morphogenic and molecular phylogenic research has placed them within the extant subfamilies Guloninae, Ictonychinae, Lutrinae, Melinae, Mellivorinae, Mustelinae, and Taxidiinae, as well as the extinct subfamilies Leptarctinae, Mustelavinae, and Oligobuninae. There is no generally accepted classification of extinct mustelid species, and many discovered species have not been placed within any subfamily. The species listed here are based on data from the Paleobiology Database, unless otherwise cited. Where available, the approximate time period the species was extant is given in millions of years before the present (Mya), also based on data from the Paleobiology Database. All listed species are extinct; where a genus or subfamily within Mustelidae comprises only extinct species, it is indicated with a dagger symbol .

 Subfamily Guloninae
 Genus Canimartes
 C. cumminsii
 Genus Ferinestrix (4.9–1.8 Mya)
 F. vorax (4.9–1.8 Mya)
 Genus Gulo
 G. diaphorus
 G. primigenius (12–5.3 Mya)
 G. sudorus (11–1.8 Mya)
 Genus Iberictis (16–11 Mya)
 I. azanzae (16–11 Mya)
 I. buloti (16–13 Mya)
 Genus Ischyrictis (16–12 Mya)
 Genus Pekania
 P. diluviana (1.8–0.3 Mya)
 P. occulta (11–4.9 Mya)
 P. palaeosinensis
 Genus Plesiogulo (11–4.9 Mya)
 P. lindsayi (11–4.9 Mya)
 P. marshalli (11–4.9 Mya)
 Genus Plionictis (16–4.9 Mya)
 P. oaxacaensis (16–13 Mya)
 P. ogygia (16–10 Mya)
 P. oregonensis (11–4.9 Mya)
 Genus Sthenictis
 S. bellus (21–15 Mya)
 S. dolichops (16–13 Mya)
 S. junturensis (23–5.3 Mya)
 S. lacota (14–10 Mya)
 S. robustus

 Subfamily Ictonychinae
 Genus Cernictis (11–4.9 Mya)
 C. hesperus (11–4.9 Mya)
 C. repenningi (11–4.9 Mya)
 Genus Enhydrictis (2.6–0.12 Mya)
 E. ardea (2.6–0.12 Mya)
 Genus Lutravus (10.3–4.9 Mya)
 L. halli (10.3–4.9 Mya)
 Genus Oriensictis
 Genus Pannonictis (2.6–0.78 Mya)
 P. pliocaenica (2.6–0.78 Mya)
 Genus Sminthosinis (4.9–1.8 Mya)
 S. bowleri (4.9–1.8 Mya)
 Genus Stipanicicia (1.2–0.78 Mya)
 Genus Trigonictis (1.8–0.3 Mya)
 T. cookii (1.8–0.3 Mya)
 T. macrodon (1.8–0.78 Mya)
 Genus Trochictis (15–9.7 Mya)

 Subfamily Leptarctinae
 Genus Craterogale
 C. simus (21–15 Mya)
 Genus Leptarctus
 L. ancipidens (16–13 Mya)
 L. martini (16–13 Mya)
 L. mummorum (14–10 Mya)
 L. neimenguensis
 L. oregonensis (16–13 Mya)
 L. primus (16–13 Mya)
 L. progressus
 L. supremus (11–4.9 Mya)
 L. webbi (14–10 Mya)
 L. woodburnei (11–5.3 Mya)
 L. wortmani (14–10 Mya)
 Genus Trocharion
 T. albanense (16–11 Mya)

 Subfamily Lutrinae
 Genus Aonyx
 A. antiqua (0.79–0.12 Mya)
 Genus Cyrnaonyx (0.79–0.12 Mya)
 C. antiqua (0.79–0.12 Mya)
 Genus Enhydra
 E. macrodonta (0.3–0.012 Mya)
 E. reevei (2.6–1.8 Mya)
 Genus Enhydriodon
 E. africanus (3.6–2.5 Mya)
E. afman
 E. dikikae (5.4–3.6 Mya)
 E. ekecaman (5.4–3.6 Mya)
 E. falconeri (5.4–2.5 Mya)
 E. kamuhangirei (5.4–3.6 Mya)
E. omoensis
 E. sivalensis (3.6–2.5 Mya)
 E. hendeyi
 Genus Lontra
 L. weiri (5.4–2.5 Mya)
 Genus Lutra
 L. affinis (5.4–2.5 Mya)
 L. bravardi (2.6–1.8 Mya)
 L. bressana (2.6–0.012 Mya)
 L. castiglionis 
 L. fatimazohrae (3.6–2.5 Mya)
 L. franconica (29–23 Mya)
 L. hessica
 L. licenti
 L. lybica
 L. palaeoleptonyx
 L. simplicidens (0.79–0.12 Mya)
 L. sumatrana
 Genus Lutraeximia (2.6–0.012 Mya)
 L. trinacriae (2.6–0.012 Mya)
 L. umbra (2.6–0.78 Mya)
 Genus Lutrictis L. lycopotamicus Genus Lutrogale L. cretensis (0.13–0.012 Mya)
 Genus Megencephalon M. primaevus Genus Nesolutra (2.6–0.12 Mya)
 N. euxena (2.6–0.12 Mya)
 Genus Paludolutra (8.7–3.2 Mya)
 P. campanii (8.7–5.3 Mya)
 P. lluecai (5.4–3.2 Mya)
 P. maremmana (8.7–5.3 Mya)
 Genus Sardolutra (2.6–0.12 Mya)S. ichnusae (2.6–0.12 Mya)
 Genus Siamogale S. melilutra (12–4.9 Mya)
 S. thailandica Genus Teruelictis (9.7–8.7 Mya)
 T. riparius (9.7–8.7 Mya)
 Genus Tyrrhenolutra T. helbingi (8.7–5.3 Mya)

 Subfamily Melinae
 Genus Algarolutra (2.6–0.012 Mya)
 A. majori (2.6–0.012 Mya)
 Genus Arctomeles (11–1.8 Mya)
 A. dimolodontus (11–1.8 Mya)
 A. sotnikovae (5.4–3.6 Mya)
 Genus Cyrnolutra Genus Enhydritherium (14–4.9 Mya)
 E. terraenovae (14–4.9 Mya)
 Genus Meles M. iberica (2.6–0.78 Mya)
 M. thorali (2.6–1.8 Mya)
 Genus Limnonyx L. pontica (12–5.3 Mya)
 L. sinerizi Genus Megalenhydris (0.13–0.012 Mya)
 M. barbaricina (0.13–0.012 Mya)
 Genus Melodon (16–5.3 Mya)
 Genus Mionictis (21–7.2 Mya)
 M. angustidens (14–10 Mya)
 M. artenensis (17–15 Mya)
 M. dubia (12–7.2 Mya)
 M. elegans (21–15 Mya)
 M. incertus (21–15 Mya)
 M. letifer (21–15 Mya)
 M. pristinus (14–10 Mya)
 Genus Paralutra P. garganensis (12–5.3 Mya)
 P. jaegeri (12–9.7 Mya)
 P. lorteti (17–15 Mya)
 P. transdanubica Genus Pelycictis Genus Promeles (8.7–5.3 Mya)
 Genus Satherium S. ingens S. piscinarium (4.9–0.3 Mya)

 Subfamily Mellivorinae
 Genus Ekorus (12–7.2 Mya)
 E. ekakeran (12–7.2 Mya)
 Genus Eomellivora (12–7.2 Mya)
 E. fricki E. hungarica E. ursogulo E. piveteaui E. tugenensis E. wimani (12–7.2 Mya)
 Genus Hoplictis (14–10 Mya)
 H. grangerensis (14–10 Mya)
 Genus Mellivora M. punjabiensis (3.6–2.5 Mya)

 Subfamily Mustelinae
 Genus Baranogale B. antiqua (2.6–1.8 Mya)
 B. balcanica B. helbingi (7.3–2.5 Mya)
 Genus Dinogale (21–15 Mya)
 D. siouxensis (21–15 Mya)
 Genus Lartetictis (14–2.5 Mya)
 L. dubia (14–2.5 Mya)
 Genus Legionarictis (16–13 Mya)
 L. fortidens (16–13 Mya)
 Genus Martes M. campestris (14–10 Mya)
 M. caurina M. foxi (4.9–1.8 Mya)
 M. gazini (16–13 Mya)
 M. intermedius M. khelifensis (16–11 Mya)
 M. kinseyi (16–13 Mya)
 M. melampus M. parviloba (16–13 Mya)
 M. stirtoni (14–10 Mya)
 M. vetus (2.6–0.78 Mya)
 Genus Mustela M. buwaldi M. eversmannii (0.78–0.012 Mya)
 M. furo M. jacksoni (2.6–0.78 Mya)
 M. meltoni (4.9–1.8 Mya)
 M. ogygia M. palaeattica (12–7.2 Mya)
 M. palermina M. praenivalis (2.6–0.12 Mya)
 M. rexroadensis (4.9–1.8 Mya)
 M. spelaea Genus Putorius P. nambianus P. stromeri (2.6–0.78 Mya)
 Genus Tisisthenes (1.8–0.3 Mya)
 T. parvus (1.8–0.3 Mya)
 Genus Vormela V. beremendensis Subfamily Mustelavinae
 Genus Mustelavus (34–24 Mya)
 M. priscus (34–24 Mya)

 Subfamily Oligobuninae
 Genus Brachypsalis (24–5.3 Mya)
 B. hyaenoides (24–5.3 Mya)
 B. matutinus (21–15 Mya)
 B. modicus (16–13 Mya)
 B. obliquidens (16–13 Mya)
 B. pachycephalus (16–13 Mya)
 Genus Corumictis (34–28 Mya)
 C. wolsani (34–28 Mya)
 Genus Floridictis (21–15 Mya)
 F. kerneri (21–15 Mya)
 Genus Megalictis M. ferox (25–20 Mya)
 M. frazieri (25–20 Mya)
 M. petersoni Genus Oligobunis (24–15 Mya)
 O. crassivultus (24–15 Mya)
 O. floridanus (21–15 Mya)
 Genus Parabrachypsalis (21–15 Mya)
 P. janisae (21–15 Mya)
 Genus Paroligobunis Genus Promartes P. darbyi (27–24 Mya)
 P. fossor P. gemmarosae (31–20 Mya)
 P. lepidus (21–15 Mya)
 P. olcotti (25–20 Mya)
 P. vantasselensis (25–20 Mya)
 Genus Zodiolestes (25–15 Mya)
 Z. daimonelixensis (25–20 Mya)
 Z. freundi (21–15 Mya)

 Subfamily Taxidiinae
 Genus Chamitataxus (11–4.9 Mya)
 C. avitus (11–4.9 Mya)
 Genus Pliotaxidea P. garberi (11–4.9 Mya)
 P. nevadensis (11–5.3 Mya)
 Genus Taxidea T. mexicana (11–4.9 Mya)

 Unclassified
 Genus Acheronictis (31–20 Mya)
 A. webbi (31–20 Mya)
 Genus Arikarictis (25–20 Mya)
 A. chapini (25–20 Mya)
 Genus Brevimalictis (16–13 Mya)
 B. chikasha (16–13 Mya)
 Genus Circamustela (12–8.7 Mya)
 Genus Erokomellivora (11–2.6 Mya)
 Genus Franconictis F. huilidens F. vireti (23–20 Mya)
 Genus Kenyalutra Genus Kinometaxia Genus Laphyctis Genus Luogale Genus Marcetia (12–8.7 Mya)
 Genus Matanomictis (29–23 Mya)
 M. maniyarensis (29–23 Mya)
 Genus Melidellavus (16–11 Mya)
 Genus Mellalictis (16–11 Mya)
 M. mellalensis (16–11 Mya)
 Genus Mesomephitis Genus Miomustela (16–13 Mya)
 M. madisonae (16–13 Mya)
 Genus Mustelictis M. olivieri (34–28 Mya)
 M. robustus Genus Namibictis (24–11 Mya)
 N. senuti (24–11 Mya)
 Genus Negodiaetictis (16–13 Mya)
 N. rugatrulleum (16–13 Mya)
 Genus Palaeomeles Genus Paragale Genus Parataxidea (16–2.5 Mya)
 Genus Perunium Genus Plesictis (29–20 Mya)
 Genus Plesiogale (24–5.3 Mya)
 P. postfelina (24–5.3 Mya)
 Genus Plesiomeles Genus Poecilictis (3.6–2.5 Mya)
 Genus Prepoecilogale Genus Presictis Genus Promellivora Genus Proputorius (16–7.2 Mya)
 Genus Protarctos (5.4–2.5 Mya)
 Genus Pyctis (34–28 Mya)
 P. inamatus (34–28 Mya)
 Genus Sabadellictis Genus Semantor (5.4–2.5 Mya)
 S. macrurus (5.4–2.5 Mya)
 Genus Sinictis Genus Sivalictis Genus Sivaonyx S. bathygnathus S. gandakasensis (12–7.2 Mya)
 S. hessicus (12–5.3 Mya)
 S. lehmani (8.7–5.3 Mya)
 S. senutae (12–5.3 Mya)
 S. soriae (7.3–5.3 Mya)
 S. beyi Genus Taxodon (16–9.7 Mya)
 Genus Torolutra (5.4–3.6 Mya)
 Genus Trochotherium (13–11 Mya)
 Genus Vishnuonyx (16–11 Mya)
 V. chinjiensis (16–11 Mya)
 Genus Xenictis (2.6–0.78 Mya)
 Genus Zorilla''

References

 
Mustelidae
Mustelidae